Kilyos, also Kumköy, is a village located in the Sarıyer district of Istanbul, Turkey. It is also a well-known seaside resort on the Black Sea coast of the European side of Istanbul Province, famous for its beaches.

Places to see
There is a 14th-century Genoese castle in the village, which was restored during the era of the Ottoman sultan Mahmud II, but it is not publicly accessible since it is located in the military zone. A historical cistern, eight cannons, and a 26-meter-high monumental plane tree are also spectacular within the castle area.

See also
 Şile, another seaside resort on the Black Sea coast of the Asian side of Istanbul.

References

External links

 
 Kilyos
 Kilyos Info

Villages in Istanbul Province
Seaside resorts in Turkey
Tourist attractions in Istanbul Province
Sarıyer
Beaches of Turkey